The 1931–32 Swiss National Ice Hockey Championship was the 22nd edition of the national ice hockey championship in Switzerland. HC Davos won the championship by defeating HC Châteaux-d'Oex in the final.

First round

Eastern Series

Group 1 
HC Davos qualified for the Eastern Final as the only team in Group 1.

Group 2

Eastern Final 
 Zürcher SC - HC Davos 2:4 OT

Western Series

Western Final 
 HC Châteaux-d'Oex - Lausanne HC 2:0

Final 
 HC Davos - HC Châteaux-d'Oex 10:0

External links 
Swiss Ice Hockey Federation – All-time results

Nat
Swiss National Ice Hockey Championship seasons